Ulrich Noack (born 2 November 1942) is a German former ice hockey player, who competed for SG Dynamo Weißwasser. He played for the East Germany national ice hockey team at the 1968 Winter Olympics in Grenoble.

References

1942 births
Living people
People from Görlitz
People from the Province of Lower Silesia
German ice hockey defencemen
Sportspeople from Saxony
Olympic ice hockey players of East Germany
Ice hockey players at the 1968 Winter Olympics